Snehadeepame Mizhi Thurakku is a 1972 Indian Malayalam-language film, directed by P. Bhaskaran. The film stars Madhu, Sharada, Kaviyoor Ponnamma and Adoor Bhasi in the lead roles. The film had musical score by Pukazhenthi.

Cast
Madhu
Sharada
Kaviyoor Ponnamma
Adoor Bhasi
Sankaradi
T. R. Omana
Sujatha

Soundtrack
The music was composed by Pukazhenthi and the lyrics were written by P. Bhaskaran.

References

External links
 

1972 films
1970s Malayalam-language films
Films directed by P. Bhaskaran
Films based on works by Tarasankar Bandyopadhyay
Films scored by Pukazhenthi